The Funtastic World of Hanna-Barbera was a simulator ride at Universal Studios Florida and one of the park's original attractions. The story line tells that Dick Dastardly and Muttley have kidnapped Elroy Jetson. Yogi Bear and Boo-Boo give chase and the audience is in for the ride of their lives. The attraction opened on June 7, 1990 and closed on October 20, 2002.

It was created and executive produced by Peter N. Alexander and directed by Mario Kamberg with William Hanna (founder of Hanna-Barbera, animation producer and creator) as creative consultant. It was the first ride film to predominantly use computer-generated imagery, with the characters created using traditional cel animation techniques and optically composited.

This was the first of three simulator ride attractions to be built inside Soundstage 42 in Universal Studios Florida, followed by Jimmy Neutron's Nicktoon Blast and the current Despicable Me Minion Mayhem, as well as the first motion simulator at Universal Orlando Resort.

Attraction

Queue
The facility which housed the ride featured several areas in which the guests were moved throughout. The outside queue area, where people waited in line, featured several televisions that showed Hanna-Barbera cartoons on a loop. When the ride first opened, the queue videos consisted of whole short episodes of Hanna-Barbera's "three-shorts" shows such as Huckleberry Hound and Yogi Bear as well as extended clips from Hanna-Barbera's well-known full-length story shows (The Flintstones, The Jetsons, etc.). In the years after, clips and commercials from Hanna-Barbera's modern cartoons such as SWAT Kats, were played on the monitors interspersed with the classic shows. The guests were then taken into a preshow area where the storyline for the ride was revealed.

Pre-show

Inside the preshow, there were 3 projection screens: two oval screens and a regular square screen. On one of the oval screens, Yogi Bear appeared pestering guests for food. Boo Boo shows up to inform him that the guests are here for an animation demonstration by William Hanna and Joseph Barbera. The two (live-action) appear on the square screen and begin talking about how  they create animated cartoons, leading to Barbera drawing Elroy Jetson, who magically comes to life and jumps out of the paper three-dimensionally. Hanna goes on to talk about computer animation using Dick Dastardly's airplane (in this case, a spaceship).

Dastardly and Muttley soon show up from inside the spaceship's depths, requesting that they be a part of Hanna-Barbera's next project. However, Hanna and Barbera inform them that the Jetsons are next (coincidentally, at the time of the ride's opening, the release of Jetsons: The Movie was only several weeks away) followed by The Flintstones and Scooby-Doo. In a fit of rage, Dastardly kidnaps Elroy by forcefully pulling him into the computer using the suction of a toilet plunger gun, claiming "If I'm not the star of the next project, then no one will be! I'm taking Elroy where you'll never find him!" The computer begins to self-destruct and Hanna and Barbera flee the studio. Yogi and Boo Boo, feeling they should do something, go (with the ride guests) into a rocket ship (the main theater) to go save Elroy from the evil plans Dastardly and Muttley have in store for him.

Ride
When the riders enter the main theater, the riders are seated in a rocket ship with Yogi as the captain. The power source is a large rubber band that fires the rocket via a giant slingshot. The force is so strong everyone ends up going back in time to Bedrock. The riders fly off a cliff and through Mr. Slate's construction site before flying into the main city. Yogi and the riders chase after Dastardly through the streets, dodging cars, residents of Bedrock (including Wilma Flintstone and Betty Rubble), and Yogi ends up chasing Fred Flintstone and Barney Rubble (who are driving Fred's car) down a street by accident. The riders fly up after Dastardly into the skies, and through a vortex. The riders end up chasing Dastardly through a cemetery in the middle of the night, and the riders are on a near-collision near the Mystery Machine that Scooby-Doo and Shaggy are driving, leading them into a castle where they encounter ghosts. The riders fly around the haunted house looking for Dastardly down hallways and corridors, dodging Scooby and Shaggy who are left hanging on a chandelier when the riders chase after Dastardly into another vortex.

This time the riders end up in the future into Orbit City, dodging flying cars and buildings. It's not long before Elroy's family (except Judy and Astro who are absent from the ride) appear and see Elroy captured, (after which he jumped from Dastardly's ship in a bold move aiming to get caught by one of his parents standing nearby, just to be pulled back in Dastardly's ship by the suction of a toilet plunger) and chase after Dastardly with the riders, going into a futuristic amusement park.

The riders fly on a roller-coaster track after the villain, and end up going down a steep drop when Rosie the Robot (flying with the Jetsons) extends her arm and lifts Dastardly and Muttley from their rocket, allowing George to save Elroy. Dastardly and Muttley then get surrounded by thousands of flying cop cars, and both are arrested and dropped in a flying jail cell. The Jetsons thank them, and the riders fly back home through a vortex and crash land back at the station on a giant inflated bumper reading "END". Yogi gives them a farewell message. "So folks, thanks for joining in the ride, I'll see you on the outside!" A lamp comes down from the top, from which Yogi pulls the light switch which makes the screen go black, ending the ride with the attendants congratulating the riders on a job well done for saving Elroy.

There was a 40-inch height requirement for the simulator, requiring smaller children to sit in a non-motion seat. Expectant mothers, people with motion sickness, heart problems, back or neck problems, were all encouraged to sit in a non-motion seat. Occasionally people on the ride would panic because of the intense motion, and the ride would be stopped by one of the operators. The ride consisted of 12 bases, each of which held 8 people for a total of 96 riders. The front row consisted of a bench in which people who did not want a motion seat could enjoy the show.

Post-show
After the show, guests were escorted into an interactive area where they could interact with various technologies geared towards children.

Hanna-Barbera's Store
Following this area, was a gift shop where Hanna-Barbera merchandise could be purchased.

Voice cast and crew

Voice cast
 Greg Burson as Yogi Bear
 Patric Zimmerman as Elroy Jetson
 Michael Bell as Dick Dastardly
 Don Messick as Boo-Boo Bear, Muttley, and Scooby-Doo
 Joseph Barbera as Himself (live-action pre-show)
 Henry Corden as Fred Flintstone
 Frank Welker as Barney Rubble, Dinosaur, Robot
 Jean Vander Pyl as Wilma Flintstone, Rosie the Robot Maid
 B.J. Ward as Betty Rubble
 Casey Kasem as Shaggy Rogers
 Jeff Bergman as George Jetson, Ghosts, Police Chief
 Penny Singleton as Jane Jetson
 William Hanna as Himself (live-action pre-show)

Crew
 Directed by - Mario Kamberg
 Produced by - Peter N. Alexander, Sherry McKenna
 Art Directed by - Allen Battino
 Visual Effects Designed by - William Powloski, Trey Stokes, Paul Van Camp, Triad, Ride Trade
 Music Composed by - James S. Levine
 Voices: Greg Burson, Don Messick, Henry Corden, Jean Vander Pyl, Frank Welker, B.J. Ward, Michael Bell, Casey Kasem, Jeff Bergman, Penny Singleton, Patric Zimmerman
 Animation Direction by - David J. Steinberg, Brian M. Jennings
 Computer Animation by deGraf/Wahrman, Rhythm & Hues
 Computer Animation Systems by Silicon Graphics, Wavefront Technologies, Alias Research, Softimage 3D, Apple Macintosh, Symbolics Graphics Division, Pixar RenderMan
 2D Animation Production by - Sullivan Bluth Animation (Ireland) Limited
 Directing Animators: Ken Duncan, Mark Koetsier, Larry Leker, Linda Miller, Jean Morel, John Pomeroy
 Animators: Matt Bates, Johan Klingler, Dave Kupczyk, Joe McDonough, Mark Pudleiner, Nassos Vakalis, Bill Waldman, Todd Waterman, Shane Zalvin
 Assistant Animators: Johan Klingler, Randy Sanchez
 Creative Consultant - William Hanna
 Post Production Optical Supervisor - Gregory Van der Veer
 Distributed by - Universal Studios

History

Production
The character animation was by Sullivan Bluth Animation (Ireland) Limited and directed by David J. Steinberg, who replaced Kurtz & Friends and director Bob Kurtz who were the original vendors. Universal wanted the ride film to have a classical animation look, with full feature-quality using the Hanna-Barbera characters. Kurtz & Friends had already been hired by Hanna-Barbera to contribute sequences for Jetsons: The Movie. Midway through production Bob Kurtz and his company resigned from the project citing creative differences, so Universal contacted Bluth's company, whom worked with Universal in the past, to do animation for the ride.

Some of the animators went to the Burbank facility with several other freelance animators while Bluth's team in Dublin went on with Rock-a-Doodle and A Troll in Central Park, the current projects at Bluth's company at the time. The director, Mario Kamberg, and art director, Allen Battino, were also the principal creative forces behind its replacement ride Jimmy Neutron's Nicktoon Blast. Rhythm & Hues created the CG Jetsons sequence for the ride film. deGraf/Wahrman created the CG Flintstones and Scooby-Doo portion of the film.

Unlike most traditional simulator rides (such as Star Tours or Body Wars) the entire ride takes place inside an auditorium, with the audience in chairs that move. Non-moving chairs were also available for those who only wanted to watch the film. The ride vehicles for Universal Studios Florida were created by Ride Trade. The vehicles had 4 degrees of freedom and had 8 seats, the motion was programmed by Trey Stokes and Dave Philipsen, with software designed by Dave Philipsen. Yogi and Boo Boo's Hanna-Barbera rocket which guests would ride in was previously featured on Yogi's Treasure Hunt and Joe Barbera and Bill Hanna's computer from the pre-show would later make an appearance on Wake, Rattle, and Roll.

Closure
The ride closed on October 20, 2002, and was replaced by Jimmy Neutron's Nicktoon Blast, featuring Nickelodeon's Jimmy Neutron alongside characters from Rugrats, Hey Arnold!, The Fairly OddParents, SpongeBob SquarePants, and other Nickelodeon cartoons, in spring 2003. In 2006, Paramount Parks (now part of Cedar Fair, and formerly co-owned with Hanna-Barbera as KECO Entertainment under Taft Broadcasting and Great American Broadcasting) acquired a license to this simulator for use in their parks, such as Canada's Wonderland. After the license expired, the ride was replaced by SpongeBob SquarePants 4-D. The film was also shown at Kentucky Kingdom with its original name and The Park at MOA under the name of Yogi's Big Rescue. It also was at Dollywood for KidsFest 2007 in Pigeon Forge, Tennessee under the name Yogi's Wild Ride.

See also
List of amusement rides based on television franchises

References

External links
The Funtastic World of Hanna-Barbera at Orlando Rocks

The Funtastic World of Hanna-Barbera at Trudang
Ride video

Simulator rides
Crossover fiction
American animated short films
Universal Parks & Resorts films
Universal Studios Florida
Universal Parks & Resorts attractions by name
Licensed properties at Universal Parks & Resorts
Amusement rides based on television franchises
Amusement rides manufactured by Intamin
Hanna-Barbera
The Jetsons
Scooby-Doo in amusement parks
The Flintstones in amusement parks
Yogi Bear
Wacky Races
Former Warner Bros. Global Brands and Experiences attractions
Hanna-Barbera in amusement parks
1990 establishments in Florida
2002 disestablishments in Florida
1990 establishments in Virginia
2004 disestablishments in Virginia
1990s English-language films
1990s American films